The Buchanan Furnace is a historic iron furnace located in Licking Township, Clarion County, Pennsylvania. It was built in 1844, and is a cold blast charcoal furnace measuring 30 feet by 33 feet at the base and 33 feet tall. It had a maximum production of 1,200 tons per year and was abandoned in 1858 because of a lack of timber to be used as fuel.

Thirty-one iron furnaces were built in Clarion County, mostly from 1840-1850.  They supplied the region as well as the Pittsburgh rolling mills.

It was added to the National Register of Historic Places in 1991.

References

Industrial buildings and structures on the National Register of Historic Places in Pennsylvania
Industrial buildings completed in 1844
Buildings and structures in Clarion County, Pennsylvania
National Register of Historic Places in Clarion County, Pennsylvania